Velislav Vasilev (born 27 March 2001) is a Bulgarian professional footballer who plays as a winger for Cherno More.

Career
Vasilev made his first team debut for Cherno More in a 2–0 home win against Vitosha Bistritsa on 13 June 2020, coming on as a substitute for Ilian Iliev Jr.

Career statistics

Club

References

External links
 

Living people
2001 births
Bulgarian footballers
PFC Cherno More Varna players
First Professional Football League (Bulgaria) players
Association football midfielders